The 1995 South Carolina Gamecocks football team represented the University of South Carolina in the Southeastern Conference (SEC) during the 1995 NCAA Division I-A football season.  The Gamecocks were led by head coach Brad Scott and played their home games in Williams-Brice Stadium in Columbia, South Carolina.

Schedule

Roster

References

South Carolina
South Carolina Gamecocks football seasons
South Carolina Gamecocks football